Kyaukphyu (also spelt Kyaukpyu) is a major town in Rakhine State, in western Myanmar. It is located on the north western corner of Yanbye Island on Combermere Bay, and is 250 miles (400 km) north-west of Yangon. It is the principal town of Kyaukphyu Township and Kyaukphyu District. The town is situated on a superb natural harbor which connects the rice trade between Calcutta and Yangon. The estimated population in 1983 was 19,456 inhabitants. The population of Kyaukphyu's urban area is 20,866 as of 2014, while Kyaukphyu Township's population is 165,352.

Etymology
The name Kyaukphyu is the Burmese pronunciation. In Rangbre and Arakanese, the town's name is pronounced "Kyaukphru."

History 
Earliest traces of history dates back to the 8th century, during the reign of Sula Taing Chandra who founded the settlement. 

The place where the present town is, was originally a small fishing village in the 17th century. After the first Anglo-Burmese War, the British established Kyaukphyu in 1837 on the spot of the fishing village. In 1852, Kyaukphyu became a district city.

On October 22, 2010, Cyclone Giri made landfall on the west coast of Myanmar just north of the town at category five strength.

Climate

Kyaukphyu has a tropical monsoon climate (Köppen climate classification Am). Temperatures are very warm throughout the year, although the winter months (December–February) are somewhat milder. There is a winter dry season (December–April) and a summer wet season (May–November). Torrential rain falls from June to August, with over  falling in July alone.

Demographics
The town is populated with Arakanese Buddhists. There are also small Indian group, Kameins and Chins at Kyaukphru.

Quarters or wards
Eastern Quarter
Western Quarter
Central Quarter
Mrit Nar Dan Quarter
Zayditaung Quarter
Asoera Quarter
Ararshi Quarter
Thanbanchaung Quarter
Rakhine Paikseik  Quarter
Taung Rong Quarter
Toe Chayy Quarter
NgaLaPwee Quarter
Kanyin Taw Quarter
KaLaBa Taung Quarter
Zetiya Quarter
Pyinpyumaw Quarter
Sapyingyin Quarter

Attractions
Kyaukphyu Viewpoint, or more popularly known as Point is perhaps the best-known attraction in Kyaukphyu. It is at the end of the Strand Road and looks out into the Bay of Bengal and the mouth of the Thanzit (Kyaukphyu) River.
Gant-gaw-taw, is one of the most sacred Buddhist shrine, believed to have built in the Vesali period.
Kyauk-ta-lone phaya, built by King Min-ba in the Mrauk U period, is the focal point of Kyaukphyu's Buddhist environment, beside Gant-gaw-taw shrine.
The Japan-Myanmar Relationship Pagoda, in the outskirts of the city, is popular among the city's small Japanese population.

Education
Teacher training college (TTC) was opened in Kyaukphyu in 1953. Now, this college is known as "Kyaukphyu Education College". In 1954, Kyaukphyu Intermediate College for Arakan, the embryo of Sittwe University was opened in Kyaukphyu. Kyaukphyu GTI was opened in 2014.

Other
Maurice Collis, a famous British writer, lived in Kyaukphyu in 1920s. His house, situated outskirts of Kyaukphyu is maintained as a historic building.

Water ways is the main mode of transportation and traveling. There were boat accidents because of poor maintenance and lack of enforcement on regulation. Over 100 were assumed to be dead in Aung Takon 3 ferry accident of March 2015.

Naval base
Google Earth imagery dated 25 July 2020 shows an active naval base to be present 5.83 km east of the town at 19.4125, 93.60197. The base has permanent personnel accommodation, support buildings and a dedicated jetty. Several corvettes and patrol boats have been observed moored at this jetty.

Economy

Port
In June 2007, Asia World announced that it would be building a deep sea port on Maday Island in Kyaukphyu. The port will be a transit point for goods destined for Yangon, Kolkata, and Chittagong. The port is part of the 21st Century Maritime Silk Road that runs from the Chinese coast to the south via Singapore towards the southern tip of India, then through the Red Sea via the Suez Canal to the Mediterranean, there via Haifa, Istanbul and Athens to the Upper Adriatic region to the northern Italian hub of Trieste with its rail connections to Central Europe and the North Sea, and would also be the maritime endpoint of the China-Myanmar Economic Corridor.

Oil pipeline
In December 2008, China and Burma signed a deal to construct an oil pipeline at Kyaukphyu. On 30 November 2010, the China Development Bank and Myanmar Foreign Investment Bank signed a $2.4 billion loan deal to construct the  pipeline from Kyaukphyu to Kunming in Yunnan province, China. The pipeline is expected to be completed in 2015 and capable of transporting 400,000 barrels of oil per day. These construction projects will allow China to directly obtain oil and gas from the Middle East (via the port terminal at Kyaukphyu), thereby avoiding shipping through the Malacca Straits.

Natural gas pipeline and terminal
Separately, as reported by the Financial Times in February 2013, nearly 2,000 workers are finalising close to Kyaukphyu, a major natural gas projects, the Shwe gas pipeline and onshore terminal. This terminal and pipeline are being built by South Korea's Daewoo International in a consortium with state-owned Myanmar Oil and Gas Enterprise (MOGE) and others. From May 2013, this pipeline is planned to pump about 12bn cubic metres of natural gas annually, most of which will also go to China via nearby Maday island.

These oil and gas Sino-Burma pipelines projects are supervised by a Myanmar "Kyaukphyu Special Economic Zone" agency and are estimated to use about U$3bn of investments and to have the potential of creating over 200,000 jobs, while additional capital will be required to develop a port for dry containerized and bulk cargoes, as well as a railway which will link Kyaukphyu to Kunming, in Yunnan.

Kunming-Kyaukphyu Railway
The railway project would be 1,215 km long, and its design and construction are subject to a preliminary agreement between Myanmar's and China's government.

In 2009, a railway link through to Jiegao in China was proposed. In 2011 the proposal was expanded to a link between Kunming and Kyaukphyu. President Thein Sein's signed a memorandum of understanding during his May 2011 visit to Beijing between Myanmar's rail transport ministry and China's state-owned Railway Engineering Corporation to build the railway. It will also connect to Kaladan Multi-Modal Transit Transport Project via 311 km link to be completed by 2021–22, from Kyaukhtu in north to Ann in south and then south-east to Minbu.

The standard gauge line to Kyaukphyu port opened in 2021.

Special Economic Zone and its impact
Myanmar government officials have stated that these massive projects will be conducted with enhanced consultation with the local population. In this respect, there has already been protests by some locals against the consequences of some of these projects, such as potential impact on fishing or land confiscations which may be conducted by authorities for these terminals and pipelines.
A December 2012 report by the "Arakan Oil Watch" organization about plans to build a special economic zone near Kyaukphyu on Ramree Island in Arakan State, claimed it would "endanger the health of thousands of people and destroy Myanmar's second largest mangrove forest". The report, titled "Danger Zone," states that around 40 villages would be adversely affected by the project, which would use 120 km2 of pristine coastline.

End December 2015, the Myanmar government announced that it had chosen a consortium of mostly Chinese companies to develop a special economic zone and a deep-water port, as a result of a tender initiated in 2014 for an industrial park and a deep-water port to be built and operated as public–private partnerships.

The selected Chinese-led consortium won over a dozen other bidders to win the development rights late last year. The six companies in the consortium include China state-owned groups Citic (finance), China Harbour Engineering, China Merchants Holdings (International), TEDA Investment Holding, Yunnan Construction Engineering Group (YNJG), and the Charoen Pokphand Group, a Thai conglomerate. CITIC and the six other investing firms will hold an 85 percent stake, with the Burmese government taking the rest.

While China Harbour Engineering is a well-known engineering firm for designing and building deep sea ports, the China Merchants Group, through some of its affiliates (China Merchants Holdings (International), China Merchants Group, both listed on the Hong Kong stock exchange, and China Merchants Energy Shipping) is a global operator of ports as well as of oil tanker and dry bulk ships which has been approved to absorb in 2016 another Chinese state-controlled tanker and bulk ships operator, Sinotrans Shipping.

By 2025, the consortium plans to build a roughly 1,000-hectare industrial park and Myanmar's highest-capacity port, with facilities able to handle 7 million 20-foot-equivalent-units (TEU) of containerized cargo per year. Total project costs are estimated to be in the range of several billion dollars. The projects are said to lead to the creation of some 100,000 jobs.

Some analysts claim that the Kyaukphyu deep-water port has a strategic dimension as part of China's Belt and Road Initiative and String of Pearls strategy.

The Kyaukphyu port and Special Economic Zone (SEZ) is one of three major port and coastal development projects in Myanmar, together with the Thilawa zone near Yangon, the country's most populous and economically developed city, and the Dawei zone in the south-east, near the Thai border, all of which have attracted major financial and industrial interests.

See also
 Point, Kyaukphyu
 Kyaukphyu Airport
 Shwe gas field
 Sino-Burma pipelines

References

External links
 Taipei American Chamber of Commerce; Topics Magazine, Analysis, November 2012. Myanmar: Southeast Asia's Last Frontier for Investment, BY DAVID DUBYNE
 Oilseedcrops.org; Editor Article, Transit routes from western China through Myanmar.  Myanmar: the Missing Link from Western China to India's N.E. States

Township capitals of Myanmar
Populated places in Rakhine State